Albert Baumann was a Swiss sport shooter. He competed at the 1896 Summer Olympics in Athens. Baumann competed in the military rifle event. He placed eighth with a score of 1,294.

References

External links 
 

Year of birth missing
Year of death missing
Shooters at the 1896 Summer Olympics
19th-century sportsmen
Swiss male sport shooters
ISSF rifle shooters
Olympic shooters of Switzerland
Place of birth missing
Place of death missing